Ratu Kolinio Rokotunaceva (1936 – 14 June 2008) was a Fijian chief and politician, who served as a Senator from 2001 to 2006 as one of 14 nominees of the Great Council of Chiefs.  He held the traditional title of Tui Levuka.

Prior to his appointment to the Senate, Rokotunaceva served as Assistant Minister for Education in the interim Cabinet formed by Laisenia Qarase in the wake of the Fiji coup of 2000.  He held office till an elected government took power in September 2001.

Experiences and opinions 

During the coup crisis, rebels supporting insurrectionist George Speight reportedly tried to kidnap Rokotunaceva in early July 2000.  The failed abduction reportedly coincided with the burning down of Levuka's historic Masonic lodge, the oldest in the South Pacific.

Rokotunaceva was known for his outspoken opinions.  On 28 October 2001, the Fiji Sunday Times reported that he had strongly opposed Australian proposals to bring asylum-seekers from Afghanistan to an island in the Lomaiviti group for processing.  Fiji's racial mix was already complicated enough, he claimed.  Children born during the application-processing period would be constitutionally entitled to Fijian citizenship, he said, creating a legal crisis.  He drew attention to the historical arrival of the first Indian cane-cutters, many of whom were never repatriated.   "We have enough problems to deal with right now," he declared.

Personal life 

Rokotuinaceva had three sons and a daughter with his wife, Adi Kelera.

Fijian chiefs
I-Taukei Fijian members of the Senate (Fiji)
2008 deaths
1936 births
Government ministers of Fiji
Politicians from Levuka